Ross, Skye and Lochaber is a constituency of the House of Commons of the Parliament of the United Kingdom (Westminster). It elects one Member of Parliament (MP) by the first past the post system of election.

Until the 2015 general election, it was represented by former Liberal Democrat leader Charles Kennedy. Since then, it has been represented by Ian Blackford, the former leader of the Scottish National Party in the House of Commons from 2017 to 2022.

Boundaries 
The constituency was created in 2005 by merging an area from Ross, Skye and Inverness West with an area from Inverness East, Nairn and Lochaber. Most of the rest of Ross, Skye and Inverness West was merged with the rest of Inverness East, Nairn and Lochaber to form Inverness, Nairn, Badenoch and Strathspey. A small area of Ross, Skye and Inverness West was merged into Caithness, Sutherland and Easter Ross.

For representation in the Scottish Parliament (Holyrood) the area of the Westminster constituency is divided between Caithness, Sutherland and Ross and Skye, Lochaber and Badenoch.

Local government area 
See also Politics of the Highland council area

The Ross, Skye and Lochaber constituency is one of three Westminster constituencies covering the Highland council area, the other two being Inverness, Nairn, Badenoch and Strathspey and Caithness, Sutherland and Easter Ross. Ross, Skye and Lochaber covers a central portion of the council area, with Inverness, Nairn, Badenoch and Strathspey to its south and east and Caithness, Sutherland and Easter Ross to its north. Ross, Skye and Lochaber includes the Black Isle on the east coast of Scotland and, in the west, the Hebridean island of Skye.

When created in 2005, the Ross, Skye and Lochaber constituency covered 26 out of the 80 wards of the council area: 11 wards (Avoch and Fortrose, Black Isle North, Conon and Maryburgh, Dingwall North, Dingwall South, Gairloch, Knockbain and Killearnan, Lochbroom, Lochcarron, Muir of Ord and Strathpeffer and Strathconon) out of the 18 wards of the Ross and Cromarty committee area, all of the six wards of the Skye and Lochalsh area committee, all of the eight wards of the Lochaber committee area and one ward (Beauly and Strathglass) out of the 23 wards of the Inverness area committee.

Ward boundaries were redrawn again in 2007, and the management areas were abolished in favour of three new corporate management areas. The new areas consist of groups of the new wards, and boundaries are similar to those of the Westminster constituencies, as created in 2005. Two areas, the Caithness, Sutherland and Easter Ross area and the Ross, Skye and Lochaber area, have the names of Westminster constituencies. The name of the third area, the Inverness, Nairn, and Badenoch and Strathspey area, is very similar to that of the third constituency.

Members of Parliament

Elections

Elections in the 2010s 

 ''Note: The constituency was new in 2005 and +/- percentages are notional.

References

External links 
*

Highland constituencies, UK Parliament
Westminster Parliamentary constituencies in Scotland
Constituencies of the Parliament of the United Kingdom established in 2005